The Imam Ali Mosque (Masjid ʾImām ʿAlī), is the largest and only Shia Muslim mosque in the country located in Nordvest, Copenhagen, Denmark.

The construction of the mosque started in 2009.  It was completed and opened to the public in 2015.  The 2,100 square metre mosque is designed in neo-Iranian architectural style, with two 32-metre minarets and a central, turquoise dome with a space for 1,500 people.

References

External links

Official website

2015 establishments in Denmark
Mosques completed in 2015
Shia mosques
Mosques in Denmark
Religious buildings and structures in Copenhagen